Pardosa tesquorum is a spider in the genus Pardosa ("thinlegged wolf spiders"), in the family Lycosidae ("wolf spiders").
The distribution range of Pardosa tesquorum includes Russia, Mongolia, China, the US, and Canada.

References

External links
NCBI Taxonomy Browser, Pardosa tesquorum

tesquorum
Spiders described in 1901